The 2016 Taça de Angola was the 35th edition of the Taça de Angola, the second most important and the top knock-out football club competition following the Girabola. 

The winner qualified to the 2017 CAF Confederation Cup.

Stadia and locations

Championship bracket

Preliminary rounds

Round of 16

Quarter-finals

Semi-finals

Final

See also
 2016 Girabola
 2017 Angola Super Cup
 2017 CAF Confederation Cup
 Recreativo do Libolo players
 Progresso do Sambizanga players

External links
 profile at girabola.com

References

Angola Cup
Taca de Angola
Taca de Angola